Deherainia is a genus of plants in the family Primulaceae, endemic to Central America.

Species 
 Deherainia cubensis
 Deherainia lageniformis
 Deherainia matudae
 Deherainia matudai
 Deherainia smaragdina

References 

 Arctos Database entry
 ZipCodeZoo entry, with photograph

Primulaceae
Primulaceae genera
Taxa named by Joseph Decaisne